This is a list of print media in New Zealand. New Zealand once had several daily newspapers in each major city, usually a morning paper (which had a wider circulation into rural areas) and an evening paper)  As in other countries, the print medium has been damaged by radio, then television and then the internet. The major cites now have only one daily newspaper.

There are no truly national newspapers, although The New Zealand Herald and to a lesser extent The Dominion Post are both available outside their core areas. The four main centres of Auckland, Wellington, Christchurch, and Dunedin are served by The New Zealand Herald, The Dominion, The Press, and the Otago Daily Times, respectively. There are also several weekly newspapers with a national scope, including two tabloids, the Sunday News and the Herald on Sunday. There are also numerous low-budget and free weekly newspapers catering for particular suburbs or for subcultures including the gay and farming communities and various ethnic groups.

The ownership of New Zealand newspapers is dominated by Fairfax New Zealand and NZME, with Fairfax having 48.6 per cent of the daily newspaper circulation.

Dailies

National weekly papers
 Herald on Sunday
 National Business Review
 Sunday News
 The Sunday Star-Times  
 The Farmers Weekly NZ

Free newspapers
Free newspapers are often called 'community newspapers' in New Zealand. Most are published weekly, in tabloid format.

 Auckland City Harbour News, Auckland
 Central Leader, Auckland
 Clutha Leader, Balclutha
 Cook Strait News
 East & Bays Courier, Auckland
 Eastern Courier, Auckland
 The Ensign, Gore
 The Flagstaff, Devonport, Auckland
 Hamilton News
 Hamilton Press
 Hibiscus Matters, Orewa
 Horowhenua Chronicle
 Mahurangi Matters, Warkworth
 Manukau Courier, Auckland
 North Shore Times, Auckland
 Northern News, Kaikohe
 Raglan Chronicle
 River City Press, Whanganui
 Rodney Times, Auckland
 The Star, Christchurch
 The Star, Dunedin
 The Weekend Sun, Bay of Plenty
 Western Leader, Auckland

 contact, Wellington

Magazines 

 Australian Women's Weekly NZ Edition
 Investigate
 Metro
 New Zealand Fishing News
 New Zealand Listener
 New Zealand Woman's Weekly
 North & South

Student magazines

 Canta – University of Canterbury
 Craccum – University of Auckland
 Critic – University of Otago
 Debate – Auckland University of Technology (AUT)
 Gyro – Otago Polytechnic
 Nexus – University of Waikato
 Salient – Victoria University of Wellington
 Massive - Massey University

Literary magazines

 Landfall
 Sport
 takahē

Historic

Magazines 

 Phoenix (1932)
 Spilt Ink (1932–1937)
 New Zealand Mercury (1933–1936)
 Oriflamme and Sirocco (1933)
 Tomorrow (1934–1940)
 Women To-day (1936–1939)
 Book (1942–1947)
 Arena (1942–1975)
 New Zealand New Writing (1943–1945)
 Here and Now (1948–1957)
 Junior Digest (1945–1965)
 Te Ao Hou / The New World (1952–1974)
 Out! (1976–2009)

Newspapers 

Note: these newspapers are listed by decade of first issue. For place and years published see Papers Past.

1830s
 New Zealand Gazette

1840s
 Nelson Examiner and New Zealand Chronicle
 New Zealand Spectator and Cook's Strait Guardian
 New Zealander

1850s
 The Colonist
 Daily Southern Cross
 Hawke's Bay Herald
 Lyttelton Times
 New Zealand Chronicle
 Otago Witness
 Taranaki Herald

1860s
 Bruce Herald at Milton, Otago
 The Christchurch Star
 The Evening Post
 Evening Star
 Grey River Argus
 Nelson Evening Mail
 The Timaru Herald
 Tuapeka Times
 The Wellington Independent
 West Coast Times

1870s
 Auckland Star
 Bay of Plenty Times
 The New Zealand Times (Wellington; 1874–1927)
 North Otago Times
 Southland Times
 Timaru Herald
 Wanganui Chronicle
 Wanganui Herald

1890s
 Paeroa Gazette
 The Kawhia Settler and Raglan Advertiser 1901-1936

1910s
 Industrial Unionist Maoriland Worker, aka the Standard 1930sZealandia 1990s
 New Zealand Russian Monthly'' (published by Russian association of Auckland, this newspaper published its final edition in November 2000)

See also
 Joseph Ivess (1844–1919), who had an association with about 40 newspapers and founded many of them

References

External links
Papers Past, a collection of digitised historical print media (including newspapers) run by the National Library of New Zealand

New Zealand
Print media in New Zealand